Now That's What I Call Classic Rock Hits is one of many genre-themed compilation albums from the Now! series in the United States, this one focusing on popular classic rock songs from the 1970s. It was released on May 1, 2012.

Track listing

Reception

In his review for Allmusic, Gregory Heaney says "the Now series delivers a dose of good ol' classic rock with Now That's What I Call Classic Rock Hits," which "gathers some of rock's most enduring crossover hits." Now That's What I Call Classic Rock Hits is "an album that achieves its primary goal of being able to please most of the people most of the time with a wide-ranging selection of hits that should fit into most anyone's definition of classic rock."

References

External links
 Official U.S. Now That's What I Call Music website

2012 compilation albums
Classic Rock Hits
EMI Records compilation albums